Treachery Rides the Range is a 1936 American Western film directed by Frank McDonald, written by William Jacobs, and starring Dick Foran, Paula Stone, Craig Reynolds, Monte Blue, Carlyle Moore Jr. and Henry Otho. It was released by Warner Bros. on May 2, 1936.

Plot

Cast  
Dick Foran as Capt. Red Taylor
Paula Stone as Ruth Drummond
Craig Reynolds as Wade Carter
Monte Blue as Col. Drummond
Carlyle Moore Jr. as Little Big Wolf
Henry Otho as Burley Barton
Jim Thorpe as Chief Red Smoke
Monte Montague as Henchman Nebraska
Don Barclay as Corporal Bunce
Frank Bruno as Little Fox
Milton Kibbee as Man at Relay Station 
Tom Wilson as Denver
Bud Osborne as Henchman Pawnee
Nick Copeland as Neal

Reception
T.M.P. of The New York Times said, "Set against a picturesque background of rolling hills, Treachery Rides the Range moves smoothly from beginning to end and is nicely acted by Mr. Foran and Paula Stone, who provide the romantic interest; by Monte Blue as the colonel and Jim Thorpe as the Indian chief."

References

External links 
 

1936 films
American Western (genre) films
1936 Western (genre) films
Warner Bros. films
Films directed by Frank McDonald
American black-and-white films
1930s English-language films
1930s American films